Mangog is a fictional character appearing in American comic books published by Marvel Comics.

Publication history
The character first appeared in Thor #154 (July 1968) and was created by Stan Lee and Jack Kirby.

Fictional character biography
The character was described in his debut as being the sum total of the hatred of "a billion billion beings" - an alien race that once attempted to invade Asgard (thwarted by Odin, the ruler of Asgard and the Norse gods). Imprisoned beneath Asgard, Mangog is freed by the rock troll Ulik, in a failed bid to secure an ally against the gods. Mangog storms Asgard, intent on drawing the Odinsword from its scabbard which will end the universe. Thor battles Mangog to a standstill, until Odin dissolves the creature by breaking the spell which had created Mangog as a living prison for his entire race.

Mangog reappeared when freed by the god Loki, but was defeated when removed from the source of its power. With the aid of the traitorous magician Igron, Mangog assumes the form of an imprisoned Odin, and intends to once again draw the Odinsword. After a series of skirmishes with Thor, the creature is defeated when Thor frees Odin.

The character reappears twice in the second volume of Thor: as the servant of a clone of the Titan Thanos (destroyed by Thor) and in a desolated Asgard during Ragnarok (dispelled by Thor with the Odinforce) Mangog reappears in the Thunderstrike mini-series when accidentally summoned by a mystical generator, and is eventually defeated when cast into a distant star.

Reappearing in The Mighty Thor, Mangog decimates Asgard until he was hurled by Jane Foster (the new Thor) into the sun.

Powers and abilities
Mangog possesses the strength, stamina, durability and endurance of a "billion billion beings", and has the ability to manipulate magic for energy projection and shapeshifting.

The character appears to be indestructible, and has stated it will always exist so long as there is hatred. Mangog is also called "the Judgement of the Gods", drawing strength from every cruel act performed by the gods.

Other versions

Heroes Reborn
 In an alternate reality depicted in the 2021 Heroes Reborn miniseries, the Mangog became the All-Gog: Final All-Father, Destroyer of Asgard after devouring most of the Asgardians. Following this, he went on to destroy Asgard and join the Masters of Doom. While fighting Power Princess in the present, however, she uses one of her gauntlets to badly injure him before turning him into a statue.

Marvel Fanfare
 In an alternate universe, Mangog battles the Herald of Galactus, Silver Surfer.

What If?
 Mangog attempts to take advantage of Odin's need for the Odinsleep but is stopped by Jane Foster, who has found Thor's hammer Mjolnir.

Ultimate Marvel
 In the Ultimate Marvel universe, Mangog is a spirit requiring a host form and battles Thor and Spider-Man.

In other media

Television
 Mangog appears in the Avengers Assemble episode "All-Father's Day", voiced by JB Blanc.

Video games
 Mangog appears in the Thor: God of Thunder, voiced simultaneously by Steve Blum, Robin Atkin Downes, Mitch Lewis, Lisa Moncure, and Mari Weiss.
 Mangog appears in Thor: The Dark World - The Official Game, voiced by Chris Phillips and Marc Thompson.

Board games
 Mangog appears in the superhero board game Heroclix in 2017 as part of "The Mighty Thor" set of collectible miniatures.

References

External links
 
 Mangog at marvel.wikia
 Mangog at immortalthor.net

Comics characters introduced in 1968
Characters created by Jack Kirby
Characters created by Stan Lee
Marvel Comics characters who are shapeshifters
Marvel Comics characters who use magic
Marvel Comics characters with superhuman strength
Marvel Comics supervillains
Thor (Marvel Comics)